For the convenience of those who read the Quran in a week the text may be divided into seven portions, each known as Manzil.

The following division to 7 equal portions is by Hamza Al-Zayyat (d.156/772): 
 Al-Fatihah (chapter 1) through An-Nisa' (chapter 4) consisting of 4 chapters (Surah).
 Al-Ma'ida (chapter 5) through At-Tawba (chapter 9) consisting of 5 chapters.
 Yunus (chapter 10) through An-Nahl (chapter 16) consisting of 7 chapters.
 Al Isra' (chapter 17) through Al-Furqan (chapter 25) consisting of 9 chapters.
 Ash-Shuara' (chapter 26) through Ya-Seen (chapter 36) consisting of 11 chapters.
 As-Saaffat (chapter 37) through Al-Hujurat (chapter 49) consisting of 13 chapters.
 Qaf (chapter 50) through An-Nas (chapter 114) consisting of 65 chapters.

See also
Juz'
Rub el Hizb

References

Quran reciting
Islamic terminology